Food Diary is a South Korean television program produced by SM C&C and airs on tvN. It stars Seo Jang-hoon, Lee Soo-geun, BoA, Park Sung-kwang, YooA (Oh My Girl), Taeyong (NCT) and Niklas Klabunde.

The program aired on Wednesdays, with the first episode on May 30, 2018 at 21:30 (KST). From the second episode on June 6, 2018 the show will air at 23:00 (KST) and ended on August 8, 2018.

Program
The program details the adventures of a cast of 'city farmers', who are in a city farm set up for them in order to prepare a dish by themselves from scratch - starting with the animals and the seeds. The dish they will be making is Dak-bokkeum-tang.

Cast
Seo Jang-hoon
Lee Soo-geun
BoA
Park Sung-kwang
YooA (Oh My Girl)
Taeyong (NCT)
Niklas Klabunde

Episodes

Dak-bokkeum-tang

Ratings

References

South Korean reality television series
Television series by SM C&C